Evelyn Sakash (1954/5 – 2020/1) was a scenic designer who worked on television, film, and Broadway. Sakash won a Daytime Emmy in 2003 for her work on Between The Lions and was nominated for the same show the following year. Her credits include work on Mermaids, Still Alice, and Orange Is the New Black. On Broadway she was associate scenic designer for The Big Love in 1991.

Sakash was last seen in September 2020 and was reported missing. Her body was discovered in her New York City home on March 30, 2021. The New York Medical Examiner’s office (reported E! News) said Sakash had died from atherosclerotic cardiovascular disease.

References

External links

1950s births
Year of birth uncertain
2020s deaths
Year of death uncertain
Scenic designers
Hoarders
Daytime Emmy Award winners
People from New York City
Deaths from atherosclerosis